The Saskatchewan Storm were a professional basketball franchise based in Saskatoon, Saskatchewan from 1990 until 1992. The team played in the World Basketball League. When the WBL folded, the owners of the Canadian franchises formed the National Basketball League, which was formed in 1993 and lasted for a season and a half before also folding. The ownership of the Storm franchise decided to rename their franchise in the new league, so the Storm became the Saskatoon Slam.

The Storm played their home games at Saskatchewan Place.

A couple notable Storm alumni include Thomas Lyles,  the father of San Antonio Spurs player Trey Lyles and current UC Davis Aggies men's basketball coach Jim Les.

Sources
http://www.apbr.org/wbl88-92.html

World Basketball League teams
Sport in Saskatoon
Sports teams in Saskatchewan
Defunct sports teams in Saskatchewan
Basketball in Saskatchewan
Basketball teams established in 1990
Sports clubs disestablished in 1992
1990 establishments in Saskatchewan
1992 disestablishments in Saskatchewan